Compagopiscis is an extinct genus of placoderm known from the Gogo Formation. It lived in the Upper Devonian (Frasnian stage) of Western Australia.  The genus is monotypic, with its only species being Compagopiscis croucheri.

Description 
Compagopiscis is one of the earliest known vertebrates to have teeth. An analysis of its bite force suggests that it was a generalist predator, having a diverse diet. Fossils have been found in numbers, suggesting possible schooling behavior.

Phylogeny
Compagopiscis was originally classified as a member of the family Plourdosteidae. However, phylogenetic analysis later found Plourdosteidae to be an invalid grouping, and the family was dismissed. Torosteus is now considered to be a member of the superfamily Incisoscutoidea, which belongs to the clade Coccosteomorphi, one of the two major clades within Eubrachythoraci. The cladogram below shows the phylogeny of Compagopiscis:

References 

Arthrodires
Arthrodire genera
Gogo fauna